Marquis Yi of Cai (蔡夷侯) (died 809 BC), born as Ji ? (姬?; his name is lost to history), was the seventh ruler of the State of Cai from 837 BC to 809 BC.  He was the only known son of Marquis Wu of Cai (蔡武侯). His reign lasted for 28 years like his father's.  He was succeeded by his son.

References
Shiji

Zhou dynasty nobility
Cai (state)
809 BC deaths
9th-century BC Chinese monarchs
Year of birth unknown